Hemnarayan Sah is an Indian politician and leader of Janta Dal United. He was the Member of the Bihar Legislative Assembly for Maharajganj between 2015 and 2020.

References

Indian politicians
Janata Dal (United) politicians
1960 births
Living people